Tom Johansen (born 19 July 1967) is a Norwegian former ice hockey player. He was born in Oslo, Norway. He played for the Norwegian national ice hockey team at the 1992 and 1994 Winter Olympics.

References

External links

1967 births
Living people
Ice hockey players at the 1992 Winter Olympics
Ice hockey players at the 1994 Winter Olympics
Norwegian ice hockey players
Olympic ice hockey players of Norway
Ice hockey people from Oslo